Black Mountain South Top is a top of Black Mountain in the Black Mountains range that spreads across parts of Powys and Monmouthshire in southeast Wales. It is a top which falls exactly on the Welsh-English border, straddling Powys and Herefordshire. The Offa's Dyke Path passes over the summit.

The top is an undistinguished heathery bump on Hatterall Ridge. The summit is marked by a small pile of stones.

References 

Nuttalls
Mountains and hills of Powys
Hills of Herefordshire